The Pakistan Heart Foundation (PHF 1974) which originated from the Muhammadi Hospital (MH 1970), and merged with the International Medical Research Centre (IMRC 1988), provides  non-profit cardiac care through the MH, and coordinates training for medics and paramedic, mobile health programs, clinical research and publications through the IMRC.

Management
Non-invasive cardiac diagnostic service and medical management is provided to patients from Khyber Pakhtunkhwa (NWFP), FATA and Afghanistan. Preventive community based activities include the School Health Program (SHP), and Man, Mountain and Medicine (MMM).

Cardiac care
Over the last 35 years, out outreach  projects have built a data-base of cardiac patients, which with Afghanistan, is one of the world's largest backlog of operable pediatric cardiac cases.

Location
In order to enhance its humanitarian service a charitable cardiac center is on the anvil, on 1.2 acres plot of  land, along with the existing block of building of the MH-IMRC. This project is located on the main boulevard of the new town of Hayatabad, outside the main City of Peshawar, next to the Jamrud Town, on way to the Pak-Afghan border.

Training
The teaching multi-media resource (free downloads and online publications) are in use for professional training programs, with willingness to actively associate with other communities and welfare organizations across the world.

Affiliations
Pakistan Heart Foundation is the National Member of the
World Heart Federation, Geneva. is an International Medical Research Centre, a School Health Program, a Mountain Medicine Program and a proposed Mountain Medicine Markaz, Chitral.

References

External links
Downloads for a Healthy Heart
Medical Profession

Medical and health organisations based in Pakistan
Foundations based in Pakistan